Malene Iversen is a former Danish international cricketer who represented the Danish national team between 1993 and 1999.

References

Living people
Danish women cricketers
Denmark women One Day International cricketers
1976 births
Wicket-keepers